Roxby may refer to:

Places in England:
Roxby, Lincolnshire
Roxby, North Yorkshire
Roxby, a former settlement in the civil parish of Pickhill with Roxby, North Yorkshire
Roxby, a former manor at Thornton-le-Dale, North Yorkshire

People:
 Roxby (surname)
 Henry Roxby Benson (1818–1892), British army officer
 Henry Roxby Beverley (1790–1863), English actor
 Stephen Roxby Dodds (1881–1943), English lawyer and politician
 William Roxby Beverly (c. 1810–1889), English scene-painter